Rissopsetia hummelincki is a species of sea snail, a marine gastropod mollusk in the family Pyramidellidae, the pyrams and their allies.

Distribution
This species occurs in the following locations:
 Aruba
 Bonaire
 Caribbean Sea
 Cayman Islands
 Cuba
 Curaçao
 Gulf of Mexico
 Venezuela

References

External links
 To Encyclopedia of Life
 To ITIS
 To World Register of Marine Species

Pyramidellidae
Gastropods described in 1984